This national electoral calendar for 2013 lists the national/federal elections held in 2013 in all sovereign states and their dependent territories. By-elections are excluded, though national referendums are included.

January
11–12 January: Czech Republic, President (1st round)
20 January: Austria, Referendum 
22 January: Israel, Parliament
23 January: Jordan, House of Representatives
25–26 January: Czech Republic, President (2nd round)
27 January: Bulgaria, Referendum
28 January: Bahamas, Referendum

February
3 February:
Cuba, Parliament
Liechtenstein, Parliament
10 February: Monaco, Parliament
17 February: 
Cyprus, President (1st round)
Ecuador, President and Parliament
18 February: Armenia, President
19 February: Grenada, House of Representatives
21 February: Barbados, House of Assembly
22 February: Djibouti, Parliament
24 February: Cyprus, President (2nd round)
24–25 February: Italy, Chamber of Deputies and Senate

March
3 March: Switzerland, Referendums
4 March: Kenya, President, National Assembly and Senate
5 March: Federated States of Micronesia, Parliament
9 March: Malta, Parliament
10–11 March: Falkland Islands, Referendum
12 March: Greenland, Legislature
13 March: Norfolk Island, Legislature
16 March: Zimbabwe, Constitutional Referendum

April
7 April: Montenegro, President
14 April: Venezuela, President
21 April: 
French Polynesia, Legislature (1st round)
Paraguay, President, Chamber of Deputies and Senate
23 April: Bhutan, National Council
24 April: Jersey, Referendum
27 April: Iceland, Parliament

May
5 May: 
French Polynesia, Legislature (2nd round)
Malaysia, House of Representatives
11 May: Pakistan, National Assembly
12 May: Bulgaria, Parliament
13 May: Philippines, House of Representatives and Senate
22 May: Cayman Islands, Legislature
26 May: Equatorial Guinea, Chamber of Deputies and Senate
31 May: Bhutan, National Assembly (1st round)

June
8 June: Nauru, Parliament
9 June: Switzerland, Referendums
14 June: Iran, President
23 June: Albania, Parliament
26 June: Mongolia, President

July
13 July: Bhutan, National Assembly (2nd round)
21 July: Japan, House of Councillors
25 July: Togo, Parliament
27 July: Kuwait, Parliament
28 July: 
Cambodia, National Assembly
Mali, President (1st round)
Northern Cyprus, Parliament
31 July: Zimbabwe, President, National Assembly and Senate

August
11 August: Mali, President (2nd round)

September
7 September: 
Australia, House of Representatives and Senate
Maldives, President (1st round) (election nullified)
8–9 September: Norway, Parliament
15 September: Macau, Legislature
16–18 September: Rwanda, Chamber of Deputies
20 September: Swaziland, House of Assembly
22 September: 
Germany, Bundestag
Switzerland, Referendums
27 September: Aruba, Legislature
28 September: Guinea, Parliament
29 September: Austria, National Council
30 September: Cameroon, National Assembly

October
4 October:  Ireland, Constitutional Referendums
9 October: Azerbaijan, President
20 October: 
Luxembourg, Parliament
San Marino, Referendums
25 October: Madagascar, President (1st round)
25–26 October: Czech Republic, Chamber of Deputies
27 October: 
Argentina, Chamber of Deputies and Senate
Georgia, President

November
6 November: Tajikistan, President
7 November: Falkland Islands, Legislature
9 November: Maldives, President (1st round revote)
12 November: Pitcairn Islands, Mayor, Deputy Mayor and Legislature
16 November: Maldives, President (2nd round)
17 November: Chile, President (1st round), Chamber of Deputies and Senate
19 November: Nepal, Constituent Assembly
23 November: Mauritania, Parliament (1st round)
24 November: 
Honduras, President and Parliament
Mali, Parliament (1st round)
Switzerland, Referendums

December
1 December: Croatia, Constitutional Referendum
13 December: New Zealand, Referendum
15 December: 
Chile, President (2nd round)
Mali, Parliament (2nd round)
Turkmenistan, Assembly
20 December: Madagascar, President (2nd round) and National Assembly
21 December: Mauritania, Parliament (2nd round)

Indirect elections
The following indirect elections of heads of state and the upper houses of bicameral legislatures took place through votes in elected lower houses, unicameral legislatures, or electoral colleges: 
15 February: Trinidad and Tobago, President
24 February: Cuba, President and Council of State
18 March: Isle of Man, Legislative Council
28 March, 24 April, 24 May and 19 June: Austria, Federal Council
1 April: San Marino, Captains Regent
14 April: Cameroon, 
18–20 April: Italy, President
22 April: Bangladesh, President
30 May and 27 June: India, Council of States
11 June: Nauru, President
30 July: Pakistan, President
30 September: Dominica, President
1 October: San Marino, Captains Regent
7 October: Ethiopia, President

See also
2013 in politics

References

National
National
Political timelines of the 2010s by year
National